One of the earliest telecasts of a NASCAR race was the 1960 Daytona 500, parts of which was presented as part of CBS Sports Spectacular, with announcer Bud Palmer.

In the ensuing years, but before 1979, there were three main sources of NASCAR telecasts:
ABC's Wide World of Sports, the sports anthology program, provided coverage of select NASCAR Winston Cup races in the 1970s.  In 1971, it presented a 200-lap race at Greenville-Pickens Speedway in its entirety, the first such broadcast of a NASCAR race.  Throughout the 1970s, ABC presented portions of the Daytona 500, Southern 500, and other important races.
In the late 1970s, CBS Sports Spectacular aired some races; like Wide World of Sports, they were taped and edited.
Car and Track, a weekly auto racing show hosted by Bud Lindemann, recapped all of NASCAR's top-series races in the 1960s and 1970s in a weekly 30-minute syndicated show.

CBS Sports President Neal Pilson and motor-sports editor Ken Squier believed that America would watch an entire stock car race live on television.  On February 18, 1979, CBS presented the first flag-to-flag coverage of the Daytona 500. Richard Petty won NASCAR's crown-jewel race for the sixth time, but the big story was the post-race fight on the track's infield between Cale Yarborough and Donnie Allison, who crashed together on the final lap while leading. The race drew incredible ratings, in part due to the compelling action both on and off the track, and in part because a major snowstorm on the East Coast kept millions of viewers indoors.

List of races televised

1970

From 1962 to 1978, the Daytona 500 was shown on ABC's Wide World of Sports. During the 1960s and early 1970s, the race was filmed and an edited highlight package aired the following weekend.

During the period on Wide World of Sports, the booth announcers typically served as roving pit reporters during the running of the race, as well as interviewing in victory lane. The booth commentary was recorded in post-production.

1971

1972

1973

1974

In 1974, ABC began the first semi-live coverage (joined-in-progress) of the Daytona 500. Coverage was normally timed to begin when the race was halfway over. Brief taped highlights of the start and early segments were shown, then ABC joined the race live already in progress, picking up approximately the last 90 minutes of the race. This format continued through 1978.

1975

1976

The 1976 Daytona 500 was held on the same day of the final day of competition in the Winter Olympics (also broadcast on ABC). ABC carried 30 minutes of live coverage of the start of the race, then switched to the Olympics for 90 minutes to carry taped coverage of the final two competitive events (a cross-country ski race and the final runs in the bobsled), held earlier that day. Then it was back to Daytona for about an hour-and-a-half for the finish.

1977

1978

1979

In 1979, CBS instituted the live "flag-to-flag" coverage policy. The ground-breaking 1979 broadcast ushered in the 22-year run of NASCAR on CBS.

During its entire run from 1979-2000, CBS also carried the Busch Clash (live), and in most years, carried the Twin 125s (tape-delayed).

See also
NASCAR on television in the 1960s
NASCAR on television in the 1980s
NASCAR on television in the 1990s
NASCAR on television in the 2000s
NASCAR on television in the 2010s
List of Daytona 500 broadcasters
List of Wide World of Sports (American TV series) announcers
List of events broadcast on Wide World of Sports (American TV series)

References

ABC Sports
CBS Sports
NBC Sports
Wide World of Sports (American TV series)
CBS Sports Spectacular
 
Sportsworld (American TV series)
 
 
 
 
 
 
 
 
 
 
1970s
1970s in American television